Allan Edward Collamore (June 5, 1887 – August 8, 1980) was a professional baseball pitcher who played in Major League Baseball for three seasons with the Philadelphia Athletics (1911) and Cleveland Naps / Indians (1914–1915).

External links

1887 births
1980 deaths
Philadelphia Athletics players
Cleveland Naps players
Cleveland Indians players
Baseball players from New York (state)
Worcester Busters players
Toledo Mud Hens players
Cleveland Bearcats players
Cleveland Spiders (minor league) players